Sawyer Storm Sweeten (May 12, 1995 – April 23, 2015) was an American child actor, known for playing Geoffrey Barone on the sitcom Everybody Loves Raymond.

Early life
Sweeten was born in Brownwood, Texas, to parents Timothy Sweeten and Elizabeth Millsap. He had a sister Madylin, and an identical twin brother, Sullivan – all three starring on the CBS sitcom Everybody Loves Raymond for 9 seasons. 

The Sweeten family moved to California when the twins were 6 months old; the siblings were cast less than a year later.

Later, Sawyer and Sullivan owned a house together in Riverside, California.

Death
On April 23, 2015, Sweeten died due to a self-inflicted gunshot wound to the head, nineteen days before his 20th birthday. His death prompted public tributes by his Everybody Loves Raymond costars.

His on-screen father Ray Romano was shocked by the news and said he was a "wonderful and sweet kid to be around". Sweeten's on-screen mother Patricia Heaton said that he was "a funny and exceptionally bright young man. He is gone from us far too soon."

Brad Garrett, who portrayed Sweeten's on-screen Uncle Robert, released a statement that: "The Sweeten family was our family for those nine years on Raymond. My deepest condolences and love go out to them during this unimaginable time." Sweeten's on-screen grandmother Doris Roberts remembered Sawyer as "a very sweet young man" and reminded fans to "make sure your loved ones know how much you care about them. It's very important to keep in touch." 

Phil Rosenthal, creator of Everybody Loves Raymond and husband of co-star Monica Horan, remembered Sawyer, his twin brother Sullivan, and their older sister Madylin as "children that never failed to make us laugh, or remind us of how we feel about our own children". 

His on-screen/real life sister Madylin released a statement regarding her brother's death and pleaded for everyone "to reach out to the ones you love".

Filmography

Film

Television

References

External links

1995 births
2015 deaths
20th-century American male actors
21st-century American male actors
American male film actors
American male identical twin child actors
American male television actors
Male actors from Texas
People from Brownwood, Texas
Suicides by firearm in Texas
American twins
Identical twin male actors
2015 suicides